Theretra margarita is a moth of the  family Sphingidae.

Distribution
It is known from the Northern Territory, Western Australia and Queensland.

References

Theretra
Moths described in 1877
Taxa named by William Forsell Kirby